Inherent risk, in a financial audit, measures the auditor's assessment of the likelihood that there are material misstatements due to error or fraud in segment before considering the effectiveness of internal control. If the auditor concludes that a high likelihood exist, the auditor will conclude that inherent risk is high.

See also
Inherent risk
Control risk

References

 Jackson & Stent, 2010: Auditing Notes for South African Students (7th Edition)

Auditing terms